Big Banana Feet is a 1976 comedy documentary film following Billy Connolly on his 1975 tour of Ireland. The film was directed by Murray Grigor and David Peat, and was made in two days.

In 2012, the film was restored from a single remaining copy in an American film archive.

References

External links
 
 

1976 comedy films
British comedy films
1970s English-language films